João Leite may refer to:

 João Leite River, river in Goiás, Brazil
 João Leite de Bettencourt (1916-1873), Brazilian chemist and politician
 João Leite (footballer) (born 1955), Brazilian politician and former footballer